Oberleutnant Adolf Gutknecht (born 12 September 1891, date of death unknown) was a World War I flying ace credited with eight aerial victories.

Biography
Adolf Gutknecht was born in Badingen, Germany on 12 September 1891. In the years before World War I, he joined the army as a cadet. In the beginning of the war, he campaigned in France, Bulgaria, and Macedonia. He transferred to aviation as an aerial observer, and scored a victory in June 1916. He subsequently became a pilot, having won both classes of the Iron Cross.

On 1 June 1918, he became Staffelführer of Jagdstaffel 43. The squadron was mounted on Albatros D.III and Albatros D.Va fighters. It would remain at Haubourdin Aerodrome until 22 August, by which time Gutknecht would have run his victory string to five confirmed and one unconfirmed. He was also promoted to Oberleutnant.

Gutknecht won three more victories while remaining in command of Jasta 43 until 2 November 1918. He was in hospital from 25 October onwards to war's end, however.

Sources of information

References
 Above the Lines: The Aces and Fighter Units of the German Air Service, Naval Air Service and Flanders Marine Corps, 1914–1918. Norman Franks, Frank W. Bailey, Russell Guest. Grub Street, 1993. , .

1891 births
People from Bismark, Germany
People from the Province of Saxony
Luftstreitkräfte personnel
German World War I flying aces
Recipients of the Iron Cross (1914), 1st class
Year of death unknown
Military personnel from Saxony-Anhalt